The  was a Japanese domain of the Edo period, located in Nagato Province (modern-day Yamaguchi Prefecture).

List of lords

Mōri clan (Tozama; 60,000->50,000->38,000->47,000->50,000 koku)

Hidemoto
Mitsuhiro
Tsunamoto
Mototomo
Motonori
Masahiro
Morotaka
Masataka
Masamitsu
Masayoshi
Motoyoshi
Motoyuki
Motochika
Mototoshi

References
 Chōfu on "Edo 300 HTML" (19 Oct. 2007)

Domains of Japan